Vladimir Petrovich Burich (August 6, 1932 – August 26, 1994) was a Russian poet.

He grew up in Kharkiv. He graduated from MSU Faculty of Journalism in 1955. He lived in Moscow working as an editor of Molodaya Gvardiya publishing house. Burich's poetry was occasionally published as early as 1961, but a certain degree of recognition came only in the 1980s and 90s with the appearance of the first collections of Russian vers libre "Beliy Kvadrat" (lit. White Square), "Vremya Iks" (lit. Time X) and later the Anthology of Russian vers libre. Burich was an ardent supporter of vers libre at a time when it was nearly nonexistent in the USSR. He translated modern Polish, Czech and Serbian poetry into Russian.

The poetry of Vladimir Burich is minimalist, precise and aphoristic, often with both social and philosophical overtones.

Often poignant and somber, Burich' vers libre attempts to contain as much emotion in as few as possible words.

See also
Russian literature

External links
 Vladimir Burich on the page of "Informal Poetry"

Russian male poets
1932 births
1994 deaths
Moscow State University alumni
20th-century Russian poets
20th-century Russian male writers